Bernard Mitton (9 November 1954 – 5 May 2017) was a professional tennis player from South Africa.

Mitton reached his highest singles ranking of world No. 51 on 15 December 1975, and his highest doubles ranking of 20 on 25 June 1984. His career record in singles on the ATP Tour was 199–218, winning two titles - at Newport, Rhode Island in 1978 and San Jose, California in 1979. He was the runner-up in three other tournaments: San Jose (1978), Adelaide (1979) and Johannesburg (1981).

His doubles record was 210–191, and he won nine titles: Auckland (1979); Stowe, Vermont and Cologne (1980); Richmond WCT (1981); Johannesburg (1981); Tampa (1981); Columbus, Ohio (1982); Ferrara (1983); and La Quinta, California (1984). He was the runner-up in eight tournaments: Sarasota, Florida (1978); North Conway, New Hampshire (1978); Rotterdam (1979); Maui, Hawaii (1982); Ancona (1982); Toulouse (1983); Florence (1984); and Queen's Club (1984).

Mitton had career wins over John McEnroe, Jimmy Connors, and Arthur Ashe in singles. He reached the fourth round at a Grand Slam tournament on three occasions. In his first Grand Slam tournament in 1973, he reached the fourth round of Wimbledon, then lost to Connors in straight sets. In 1976, he again reached the fourth round at Wimbledon, defeating former champion John Newcombe in the third round beforeg losing to Raúl Ramírez in four sets. He reached the fourth round at the 1980 US Open, defeating José Luis Clerc in the first round, then lost to Connors.

Mitton retired from the tour in 1984 due to injuries and joined the Newport Beach Tennis Club as director of tennis. From 2000 to 2003, he was at Rancho San Clemente. He taught until his death at the Racket Club of Irvine, California.

Career finals

Singles: 5 (2 titles, 3 runner-ups)

Doubles: 17 (9 titles, 8 runner-ups)

References

External links
 
 

1954 births
2017 deaths
People from Vryburg
South African people of British descent
Sportspeople from Irvine, California
South African expatriates in the United States
South African male tennis players
White South African people